The Emma Lake Artists' Workshops are affiliated with the University of Saskatchewan in Saskatoon. Summer art classes were originally taught by Augustus Kenderdine at Murray Point on Emma Lake in 1936. Kenneth Lochhead and Arthur McKay, professors at the University of Saskatchewan, Regina Campus (now called the University of Regina since 1974) initiated the more famous Emma Lake Artists' Workshops in 1955.

Workshop leaders by date 
1955   Jack Shadbolt (workshop leader)
1956   Joseph Plaskett (workshop leader)
1957   Will Barnet (workshop leader)
1958   No workshop
1959   Barnett Newman (workshop leader)
1960   John Ferren (workshop leader)
1961   Herman Cherry (workshop leader)
1962   Clement Greenberg (workshop leader)
1963   Kenneth Noland (workshop leader)
1964   Jules Olitski and Stephan Wolpe (workshop leaders)
1965   Lawrence Alloway and John Cage (workshop leaders)
1966   Harold Cohen (workshop leader)
1967   Frank Stella (workshop leader)
1968   Donald Judd (workshop leader) (The workshop was not held at Emma Lake, but at Rapid River Lodge, Lac La Ronge)
1969   Michael Steiner (workshop leader)
1970   Ronald B. Kitaj (workshop leader)
1971   no workshop
1972   Roy Kiyooka (workshop leader)
1973   William Wiley (workshop leader)
1974   no workshop
1975   no workshop
1976   Toni Onley, Douglas Haynes, Hubert Hohn, Sidney Tillim, Harold Feist, Hans Dommasch, Dan Solomon, Andre Fauteux, Otto Rogers, Bruce O'Neil, Joseph Reeder, and Alan Gliko (workshop guest leaders)
1977   Wynona Mulcaster, Richard Mock, Warren Rohrer, Ken Carpenter, Edna Andrade, Mina Forsyth, Rick Chenier, Carol Sutton, Anthony Caro, Terry Fenton, Douglas Bentham, and Otto Rogers (workshop guest leaders)
1978   no workshop
1979   Friedel Dzubas and John Elderfield (workshop leaders)
1980   Kenworth Moffett and Darryl Hughto (workshop leaders)
1981   Walter Darby Bannard and John McLean (workshop leaders)
1982   Stanley Boxer and James Wolfe (workshop leaders)
1983   Charles Millard and Larry Zox (workshop leaders)
1984   Tim Scott and Valentin Tatransky (workshop leaders)
1985   Maryann Harmon and Karen Wilkin (workshop leaders)
1986   Peter Bradley and John Link (workshop leaders)
1987   Tim Hilton and Terry Atkinson (workshop leaders)
1988   Joseph Drapell, Harold Feist, and Douglas Haynes (workshop leaders)
1989   Paterson Ewen, Sandra Paikowsky, and Joseph Masheck (workshop leaders)
1990   Mali Morris, Robert Kudielka, Dorothy Knowles, and Willard Boepple (workshop leaders)
1991   Kenneth Noland, John Gibbons, Terry Fenton and Nancy Tousley (workshop leaders)
1992
1993   Medrie McFwee, Lee Tribe, and Lynn Donahue (workshop leaders)
1994   Janet Fish and Victor Cicansky (workshop leaders)
1995   Judith Swartz and Landon Mackenzie (workshop leaders)
2001   Chris Cran (workshop leader)
2002
2003   Karen Wilkin and Clay Ellis (workshop leaders)
2004
2005   Robert Christie and Ron Shuebrook(co-workshop leaders)
2007   Monica Tap (workshop leader)
2009   Kim Dorland (workshop leader)
2010
2011   David Alexander (workshop leader)
2012   Elizabeth McIntosh (workshop leader)

Publications 

The Flat Side of the Landscape: the Emma Lake Artists' Workshops / curator/editor: John O'Brian ; essays, John O'Brian ... [et al.] Saskatoon : Mendel Art Gallery, c1989 (Published for the exhibition, The flat side of the landscape : the Emma Lake Artists' Workshops held from October 5, 1989 to April 21, 1991)
Abstraction West : Emma Lake and after = Abstraction dans l'Ouest : le lac Emma et après / by Terry Fenton. Ottawa : National Gallery of Canada for the Corporation of the National Museums of Canada, 1976
Emma Lake Workshops, 1955-1973. [Catalogue of an exhibition held from] September 21 to October 21, 1973. Regina : Norman Mackenzie Art Gallery, 1973

References

External links
Influences of Emma Lake Art School, Art Gallery of Prince Albert, Prince Albert, Saskatchewan.
Making Friends: The Role of Friends, Mentors and Patrons in the Development of Saskatchewan Art. Exhibition May 28, 2005 to October 23, 2005.  Organized by the MacKenzie Art Gallery, Curated by Timothy Long, Head Curator. 
University of Saskatchewan Archives. Search text and photograph database.
Anthony Caro and 1977 sculpture series made at Emma Lake.

Art schools in Canada
University of Saskatchewan